Romanisation of the Wenzhou dialect of Wu Chinese, part of the greater Ōu grouping of Wu dialects centred on the city, refers to the use of the Latin alphabet to represent the sounds of the dialect group.

Early romanisation

The first instance of Wenzhounese romanisation begins with the language documentation efforts of Christian missionaries who translated the Bible into many varieties of Chinese in both Chinese characters and in phonetic romanisation systems based largely on the Wade-Giles system. The first romanised form of Wenzhounese can be seen in an 1892 Gospel of Matthew translation.

Contemporary
In 2004, father-and-son team Shen Kecheng and Shen Jia published the work Wenzhouhua, which outlines a systematic method for romanising each initial and rhyme of the dialect. Its primary orthographic innovation is its means of expressing the three-way distinction of Wu stops in an orthography that distinguishes only between voiced and unvoiced stops.

The Shens use the same basic method and transcribe voiced stops by duplicating the voiced series of letters so  is gg in the system. Likewise,  is transcribed as hh.

Vowels are transcribed with a number of digraphs, but few are innovations. The influence of Chinese IMEs is seen in their system as well since v denotes  and ov denotes .

Tones, however, are marked not by diacritics or tone spelling but by simply placing superscript values of Chao's tone lettering system.

Rhymes

Initials

See also
Wenzhounese
Wu Chinese
Shanghainese

References

Wu Chinese
Wenzhou
Romanization